Aldo Anzuini (born 24 April 1947) is an Italian retired football player and coach. He played as defender.

Honours
Serie B
Lazio: 1968–69

Serie C
Sambenedettese: 1973–74

References

1947 births
Living people
Footballers from Rome
Italian footballers
Italian football managers
Association football defenders
Serie B players
S.S. Lazio players
Savona F.B.C. players